D. W. Voorhies House is a house in St. Martinville, Louisiana.  The building  was listed on the National Register of Historic Places on October 16, 2008.

The house was built in 1903 with many decorative features, all of which survive, although one, the front door, was moved to a different location in the house.  The details include fishscale shingles, an oculus, and beaded rails in a wraparound porch.

It is the 16th property listed as a featured property of the week in a program of the National Park Service that began in July, 2008.

References

Houses on the National Register of Historic Places in Louisiana
Houses in St. Martin Parish, Louisiana
Queen Anne architecture in Louisiana
Houses completed in 1903
National Register of Historic Places in St. Martin Parish, Louisiana
1903 establishments in Louisiana